Coonamble Shire is a local government area in the Orana region of New South Wales, Australia. The Shire is located adjacent to the Castlereagh Highway and the Castlereagh River.

Coonamble Shire includes the towns of Coonamble, Gulargambone and Quambone.

The Mayor of Coonamble Shire Council is Cr. Tim Horan, who is an independent politician.

History
Local government in the area was first established with the Municipal District of Coonamble formed on 3 May 1880. Wingadee Shire was formed later, one of 134 shires proclaimed on 7 March 1906 following passing of the Local Government (Shires) Act 1905.

Coonamble Shire itself was formed on 1 May 1952 from the amalgamation of the Municipality of Coonamble with Wingadee Shire.

Demographics

Council

Current composition and election method
Coonamble Shire Council is composed of nine councillors elected proportionally as a single ward. All councillors are elected for a fixed four-year term of office. The Mayor is elected by the councillors at the first meeting of the Council. The most recent election was held on 4 December 2021, and the makeup of the Council is as follows:

The current Council, elected in 2016, in order of election, is:

See also

List of local government areas in New South Wales

References

External links

Local government areas of New South Wales
1952 establishments in Australia